Frederick L'Ecuyer (born 28 July 1977) is a Canadian ice hockey referee, employed by the National Hockey League. He has worn the number 17 since the start of the 2010-11 NHL season.

Quebec Major Junior Hockey League career

L'Ecuyer's first Quebec Major Junior Hockey League game came in the 1999-00 QMJHL season, when he worked as a linesman. Starting in the 2000-01 QMJHL season, he would make the move to become a referee, working 57 regular season and 13 playoff games over a span of three seasons.

Central Hockey League career

Before the start of the 2002-03 CHL season, L'Ecuyer was hired to become a full-time referee for the 
Central Hockey League. His first game as an official in the league was on 18 October 2002, in a game involving the El Paso Buzzards and the San Angelo Saints.

Between the fall of 2002 and the summer of 2006, he was named to be the official at the league's All-Star Game in 2005 and also officiated three Ray Miron President's Cup finals.

American Hockey League career

L'Ecuyer worked in the American Hockey League on a part-time basis starting at the beginning of the 2003-04 AHL season. His first game in the league occurred on 11 October 2003, when the Utah Grizzlies and the San Antonio Rampage played at the AT&T Center.

During his time in the league, L'Ecuyer saw two appearances in the Calder Cup finals: 2009 and 2010.

National Hockey League career

L'Ecuyer was hired by the National Hockey League prior to the start of the 2007-08 NHL season. On 11 October 2007, he made his National Hockey League debut, when he officiated a game between the New York Islanders and the Toronto Maple Leafs at the Air Canada Centre. For his first game and through the time he was on an AHL/NHL contract, he wore sweater number 48.

Before the start of the 2010-11 NHL season, L'Ecuyer was promoted to a full-time spot on the officiating roster. His first game that season was one between the Buffalo Sabres and the Ottawa Senators at what is now known as the Canadian Tire Centre.

Stanley Cup playoffs

L'Ecuyer made his on-ice playoff debut during the 2011 Stanley Cup playoffs. He was the standby official for Game Three between the Washington Capitals and the New York Rangers at Madison Square Garden. At 3:44 of the second period, play was halted due to an injury sustained by Chris Rooney. As per NHL rule during the playoffs, a standby official is named to every game. As Rooney was unable to continue, L'Ecuyer took over officiating duties.

For the 2015 Stanley Cup playoffs, L'Ecuyer was named as one of the 20 officials who would work regular games in the first round.

References

1977 births
Canadian ice hockey officials
Ice hockey people from Quebec
Living people
National Hockey League officials
Sportspeople from Trois-Rivières